WRWK-LP (93.9 FM, "TheWorkFM 93.9") is a radio station licensed to serve the community of Midlothian, Virginia. The station is owned by Synergy Project, Inc., and airs a variety format.

The station was assigned the WRWK-LP call letters by the Federal Communications Commission on July 14, 2016.

References

External links
 Official Website
 FCC Public Inspection File for WRWK-LP
 

RWK-LP
RWK-LP
Radio stations established in 2017
2017 establishments in Virginia
Variety radio stations in the United States
Chesterfield County, Virginia